Benjamin Collard Yorston (14 October 1905 – 1977) was a Scottish professional footballer who played for Montrose, Aberdeen, Sunderland and Middlesbrough.

Career
Born in Nigg, Kincardineshire, the diminutive (5 ft 5in) forward played for Aberdeen juvenile sides Kittybrewster and Mugiemoss before joining Montrose in 1927. He spent only 3 months with the Gable Endies before returning north to sign for Aberdeen F.C.. Yorston stayed with the Dons for five seasons and remains the club's record goal-scorer for a single season, having notched 38 goals in 1929–30. He won his only cap for Scotland against Ireland in 1931.

Yorston was one of five Aberdeen players dropped after a 1–1 draw with Kilmarnock later that year. At the time, the reasons were not clear, but the club's official history claims that several players had been involved in a betting scandal.  No players were ever charged with any offence, but none of them ever played for Aberdeen again.

Yorston joined Sunderland for £2,000 in January 1932 (£ today) then moved to their North-East rivals Middlesbrough for £1,250 in 1934 (£ today). He stayed with Middlesbrough until the outbreak of the Second World War, during which he "guested" for Hibernian, Aldershot, Reading, West Ham United and Lincoln City, featuring once for Dundee United shortly after the war ended. He retired before the cessation of global hostilities.

Yorston's nephew Harry was also a professional footballer who, like his uncle, played for Aberdeen and the Scottish national side.

Career statistics

Club

International

References

External links
Biographical details at scottishleague.net

1905 births
1977 deaths
Aberdeen F.C. players
Dundee United F.C. wartime guest players
Dyce Juniors F.C. players
Hibernian F.C. wartime guest players
Middlesbrough F.C. players
Montrose F.C. players
Scotland international footballers
Scottish Football League players
Scottish footballers
Sunderland A.F.C. players
English Football League players
West Ham United F.C. wartime guest players
Reading F.C. wartime guest players
Scottish league football top scorers
Brentford F.C. wartime guest players
Association football forwards
Scottish Junior Football Association players
Scotland junior international footballers